The Chocolate Dandies was the name of several American jazz combos from 1928 through the 1940s. The name was an outgrowth of the Broadway production, The Chocolate Dandies, that debuted in 1924.

Bands 
A band led by Don Redman was the first to record with the name "Chocolate Dandies" on the Okeh label in 1928–1929. He also recorded with McKinney's Cotton Pickers and released material with that ensemble under this name. King Oliver and Lloyd Smith's Gut-Bucketeers recorded under the name for Vocalion Records in 1931.

Don Redman

Sessionography 
<li> The Chocolate Dandies
 
 Recorded October 13, 1928, New York City
 "Paducah," by Redman (music), Okeh 8627, Matrix: 401218-B 
 "Star Dust," by Hoagy Carmichael, Okeh 8668, Matrix: 401219-A
<li> "Birmingham Breakdown," by Duke Ellington, Okeh 8668, Matrix: 401220-B
<li> "Four or Five Times," by Marco Hellman (words) and Byron Gay (music), Okeh 8627, Matrix: 401221-A

Benny Carter 
Benny Carter had several ensembles in the 1930s named The Chocolate Dandies.

Sessionography 
<li> The Little Chocolate Dandies; 
 
 Recorded September 18, 1929, New York
 "That's How I Feel Today," by Don Redman (unissued), Matrix: 402965-A
 "That's How I Feel Today" (unissued), Matrix: 402965-B
 "That's How I Feel Today" Okeh 8728, Matrix:  402965-C
 "Six or Seven Times," by Fats Waller & Irving Mills (unissued), Matrix: 402966-A 
 "Six or Seven Times" (unissued), Matrix: 402966-B
 "Six or Seven Times" (unissued), Matrix:  402966-C
<li> "Six or Seven Times" Okeh 8728, Matrix: 402966-D

<li> The Chocolate Dandies
 
<li> "Goodbye Blues," Carter (vocals and arrangement), Columbia 35679, Matrix: 404566-A
 Add Fletcher Henderson
 Recorded December 8, 1930
 "We're Friends Again" (unissued), Brunswick
<li> "What Good Am I Without You?" (unissued), Brunswick
 Recorded December 31, 1930, New York
 "Cloudy Skies," by Coleman Hawkins, Columbia 35679, Matrix: 404596-B
 "Got Another Sweetie Now," by Harrison (Harrison, vocals; arranged by Carter), Columbia 36009, Matrix: 404597-B
 
<li> "Dee Blues," by Carter (Carter plays clarinet; arranged by Carter), Columbia 2543-D, Matrix: 404599-B

<li> The Chocolate Dandies
 
 Recorded October 10, 1933, New York
 "Blue Interlude," by Carter, Parlophone R1792, Matrix: 265156-2
 "I Never Knew," by Gus Kahn & Ted Fio Rito (Carter plays trumpet and also sax), Parlophone (E)R1815, Matrix: 265157-1
 "I Never Knew" (Carter plays trumpet and also sax), Phontastic (Swd)7647, Matrix: 265157-2
 "Once Upon a Time," by Carter (Carter plays trumpet and also sax), Parlophone (E)R1717, Matrix: 265158-1
<li> "Krazy Kapers," by Carter (Carter plays trumpet and also sax), Parlophone (E)R1743, Matrix: 265159-2

King Oliver

Sessionography 
<li> King Oliver and the Chocolate Dandies(most discographers, more recently, feel that King Oliver was not present on this session)
 
 Recorded April 15, 1931, 1:30–4:30 , New York
<li> "Loveless Love" (Madison, Skerritt, Lucas; vocals), Vocalion 1610, Matrix: E-36474-A
 "One More Time" (Madison, Skerritt, Lucas; vocals), Matrix: E-36625-A
<li> "When I Take My Sugar To Tea," by Sammy Fain, Irving Kahal, Pierre Norman (Pinkett; vocalist), Vocalion 1617,  Matrix: E-36626-A

Coleman Hawkins

Sessionography 
<li> Coleman Hawkins and The Chocolate Dandies

 "Smack," Mosaic MR23-123, Matrix: R2995-T
 "Smack," Mosaic MR23-123, Matrix: R2995-1
 "Smack," Mosaic MR23-123, Matrix: R2995-2
 "Smack," Matrix: R2995-3
 "Smack," Commodore FL20025, Matrix: R2995-2
 "Smack," Commodore 533, Matrix: R2995
 "I Surrender Dear," Commodore 1506, Matrix: R2996
 "I Surrender Dear," (composite) Atlantic SD2-306, Matrix: R2996-2/1
 "I Surrender Dear," (original) Mosaic MR23-123, Matrix: R2996-2
 "I Surrender Dear," Mosaic MR23-123, Matrix: R2996-3
<li> "I Can't Believe That You're In Love With Me," Commodore 1506, Matrix: R2997
<li> "I Can't Believe That You're In Love With Me," Commodore XFL14936, Matrix: R2997-1
 "Dedication" (Eldridge, Carter: out), Commodore 533, Matrix: R2998
 "Dedication" (Eldridge, Carter: out), Mosaic MR23-123, Matrix: R2998-1
<li> "Dedication" (Eldridge, Carter: out), Mosaic MR23-123, Matrix: R2998-2

Others 
Versions of groups' names "Chocolate Dandies" continued to play into the 1940s and counted among their members  Buck Clayton, Floyd O'Brien, and other members of Carter's and Fletcher Henderson's bands.

References

General 

<li> [ The Chocolate Dandies] at Allmusic

Inline 

American jazz ensembles